The 2019 FIBA U18 Women's European Championship Division B was the 15th edition of the Division B of the FIBA U18 Women's European Championship, the second tier of the European women's under-18 basketball championship. It was played in Skopje, North Macedonia, from 5 to 14 July 2019. Finland women's national under-18 basketball team won the tournament.

Participating teams

  (14th place, 2018 FIBA U18 Women's European Championship Division A)

  (16th place, 2018 FIBA U18 Women's European Championship Division A)
  (15th place, 2018 FIBA U18 Women's European Championship Division A)

First round

Group A

Group B

Group C

Group D

17th–23rd place classification

Group E

Playoffs

9th–16th place playoffs

Championship playoffs

Final standings

References

External links
FIBA official website

2019
2019–20 in European women's basketball
FIBA Europe
International youth basketball competitions hosted by North Macedonia
Sports competitions in Skopje
FIBA U18
FIBA